Helge Stormorken (8 October 1922 – 9 June 2019) was a Norwegian veterinarian and physician.

Research and organisational activity
He established the cause of a worldwide fatal bleeding disease in piglets leading to its eradication. He described the multifaceted Stormorken syndrome, a mutations in f. VII, f. IX, Fibrinogen Oslo IV and V, all with clinical consequences. Nearly thirty theses on different aspects emanated from the institute together with a host of single papers from its own staff and the many US and European visitors. The most prominent of these was Holm Holmsen who made basic discoveries establishing platelets as secretory non-nucleated cells. Stormorken was active in international organisations within the field, as chairman of the International Society on Thrombosis and Haemostasis 1978–1982, as cofounder and member of the governing board in European Thrombosis Research Organisation (ETRO) 1972–1978, as an honorary member in 1997. In 1971 Oslo and his institute was chosen as the organizer and host of the first international congress in this field.

Stormorken was also the chairman of many committees, local as well as international, a teacher of medical students and other health personnel. He headed the Norwegian Red Cross team and was wounded in the French-Algerian War of 1962. His publications, mainly international, total 260.

Career summary 
Helge Stormorken was born in Kvam in Gudbrandsdalen, Norway and obtained his veterinary degree at the Norwegian School of Veterinary Science in 1948. He opened a veterinary practice in Otta the next year. He studied in the Medical Faculty, University of Oslo from 1954, and gained a PhD in 1957, with the thesis Comparative Studies on Clotting Mechanisms in Horse, Cow, Dog and Man. He later won the Doctor of Medicine degree in 1958. He was appointed as a professor of animal physiology at the Norwegian School of Veterinary Science in 1959. He moved to the University of Oslo in 1963, as professor and head of the University of Oslo Institute for Thrombosis Research at Rikshospitalet. Then, from 1980 to 1990, he was an assistant professor at Rikshospitalet, and from 1990 to 1995 he worked for the private company Nycomed, mainly within contrast media development. By the time of his 85th birthday he had 275 academic publications.

He was decorated with the Royal Norwegian Order of St. Olav and was one of the founders and honorary member of the European Thrombosis Research Organization, Co-chairman and Chairman of the International Society on Thrombosis and Haemostasis. In 1978–82, he was a member of several national and international committees and was visiting professor at Nobel Prize winner C. Heymans Institute in Ghent, Belgium and at The Temple University, Philadelphia. In 1962 he headed the Norwegian Red Cross team to Algeria during the liberation war from France. He lived in Sandvika, a suburb of Oslo, but originated from the Gudbrandsdal Valley.

Publications

 
 
 
 
 
 
 
 
 
 
 
 
 
 
 
 
 
 
 
 Brosstad F, Teige B, Olaisen B, Gravem K, Godal HC & Stormorken H. Two-dimensional electrophoretic characterization (ISO-DALT) of fibrinogen and fibrin subunit chains from four different genetic dysfibrinogen variants. In: Fibrinogen-Structure. Eds. Haverkate et al., de Gruyter & Co, Berlin NB Årstall

References

1922 births
2019 deaths
Norwegian veterinarians
Academic staff of the Norwegian School of Veterinary Science
Academic staff of the University of Oslo
People from Bærum
People from Kvam